Darbar Sahib may refer to:

 Darbar (title), a lofty variation of the (rather rare, modest) princely title Darbar (or Durbar) in feudal India, as in petty Kamadhia (in Gujarat)
 Darbar Sahib Hall, main hall in a Sikh gurdwara
 Gurdwara Darbar Sahib Kartarpur, a holy Sikh temple in Kartarpur, Pakistan
 Sri Darbar Sahib, the Golden Temple, the holiest Gurdwara (temple) of Sikhism, in Amritsar, India
 Guru Ram Rai Darbar Sahib, a gurudwara established by Guru Ram Rai in Dehradun, India